Inorganica Chimica Acta is a peer-reviewed scientific journal published since 1967 that covers original research and reviews of fundamental and applied aspects of inorganic chemistry.

See also 
 List of scientific journals in chemistry

External links 
 

Elsevier academic journals
Inorganic chemistry journals
Publications established in 1967
English-language journals
Journals published between 13 and 25 times per year